Colégio Marista Dom Silvério, or CMDS, is a private Marist school located on the southern region of Belo Horizonte, in Brazil. Its courses go from pre-school to high school, which in the Brazilian educational system is usually identified with ages from 4 to 17.

CMDS was founded in 1950, and hosts more than 3,000 students. Part of the school's finances were used for the seven-year-long construction of Marista Hall.

The school is named after Dom Silvério Gomes Pimenta, a Catholic priest of the early twentieth century who was a member of the Academia Brasileira de Letras, the Brazilian Academy of Literature.

The current principal of CMDS is Professor Edison de Souza Leite.

Alumni 
 Priscila Fantin
 Frei Betto

See also
 Marista Hall

Schools in Brazil
Belo Horizonte
Educational institutions established in 1950
Marist Brothers schools
Education in Minas Gerais
1950 establishments in Brazil